The 2022 MotoAmerica Superbike Championship season is the 46th season of the premier class of circuit-based motorcycle racing in the United States and the 8th since its renaming to MotoAmerica. Jake Gagne entered the season as the defending champion, after taking his first title in 2021.

Calendar and results

Teams and riders

Championship standings

Riders' championship

Scoring system
Points are awarded to the top fifteen finishers. A rider has to finish the race to earn points.

Superbike Cup

References

External links
 

MotoAmerica Superbike
MotoAmerica Superbike
MotoAmerica Superbike